Simon Hodge is a racing driver from Adelaide, South Australia, Australia and winner of the 2014 Australian Drivers' Championship. In March 2014 he set a new lap record for the Adelaide Street Circuit and in April 2014 also broke the Mount Panorama lap record. Simon currently holds the record for the most consecutive pole positions in Australian Drivers' Championship history with seven.

Lap Records

Career results

References

External links 
 Official Webpage

1994 births
Living people
Racing drivers from South Australia
Formula Ford drivers
Australian Formula 3 Championship drivers
24H Series drivers